Tobin Sprout (born April 28, 1955) is an American visual artist, musician, songwriter, and children's author. He is best known as a former member of the indie rock band Guided by Voices. He served as a secondary major songwriter and guitarist of the group from 1987 to 1997 and again from 2010 to 2014.

He was also a founding member of the band fig.4, who participated in the Dayton new wave scene in the mid 80s.

Life and career

Early life 
Sprout was born in Dayton, Ohio and graduated from Centerville High School in 1974. After graduating from high school, Sprout studied graphic design and illustration at Ohio University.

Guided by Voices: 1987–1997 
A self-taught musician, Sprout played with and was a major collaborator of the Dayton band Guided By Voices. Employing a four-track recorder and a home studio he contributed to the lo-fi sound of Guided by Voices, and he was a member of the band from 1987 through 1997, and again from 2010 to 2014. The band frequently recorded in Sprout's home studio, and as a member of the band he contributed as a co-writer, multi-instrumentalist and studio engineer. Guided by Voices songs written by Sprout include "It's Like Soul Man," "Awful Bliss," and "Atom Eyes". Between the 1997 split and the 2010 reunion, he appeared on three more Guided by Voices recordings, contributing piano to the Isolation Drills song "How's My Drinking?" and guitar to the Half Smiles of the Decomposed tracks "Girls of Wild Strawberries" and "Huffman Prairie Flying Field".

Solo projects 
Although a visual artist by trade, he has continued to write his own music, releasing Carnival Boy in 1996, Moonflower Plastic in 1997 and Let's Welcome the Circus People in 1999. He wrote songs for a project called Eyesinweasel which were collected on 2000s Wrinkled Thoughts. His Demos and Outtakes collection was released in the following year. In 2001, Sprout rejoined with Robert Pollard (of Guided by Voices) to form Airport 5, independently releasing numerous singles and 2 full-length albums, Tower in the Fountain of Sparks and in 2002, Life Starts Here. He has continued writing and composing independently, from his home in Leland, Michigan, recording and releasing his fourth solo effort Lost Planets & Phantom Voices.

In 2009, Sprout released his first children's book, Elliott, published by Mackinac Island Press.

In 2010, Sprout released his fifth solo effort, The Bluebirds Of Happiness Tried To Land on My Shoulder, on his personal record label Moonflower Records.

In July 2010, Robert Pollard announced that the "Classic Lineup" of Guided By Voices would reunite for a U.S. tour, with a lineup featuring Pollard, Sprout, Mitch Mitchell, Kevin Fennell, and Greg Demos. The tour culminated with a performance in at Irving Plaza in New York City on New Year's Eve, 2010. They went on to release six new studio albums before splitting up again in 2014.

In 2017, Sprout released his sixth solo effort, The Universe & Me, changing from his personal label to the independent label Burger Records.

In 2020, Sprout announced the release of his seventh solo release titled Empty Horses, and is to be released in June with Fire Records.

Personal life
American actor Tim Allen has stated he is a collector and admirer of Sprout's artwork and illustrations.

Partial discography

Solo albums 
Carnival Boy (1996)
Moonflower Plastic (1997)
Let's Welcome the Circus People – (2000)
Lost Planets & Phantom Voices – (2003)
The Bluebirds of Happiness Tried to Land on My Shoulder – (2010)
The Universe & Me – (2017)
Empty Horses – (2020)

Singles 
Popstram (1 Toaster, 2 Sadder Than You, 3 Bottle of the Ghost Of Time – 7") –  Recordhead (1995)
"Let Go Of My Beautiful Balloon" (A Let Go of My Beautiful Balloon, B Shirley The Rainbow – 7", Single) – Wigwam Records (2001)

EPs 
Wax Nails (1 Get Your Calcium, 2 Cereal Killer, 3 Seed, 4 The Crawling Backward Man, 5 In Good Hands, 6 How's Your House? (Demo) – CD, EP) – Recordhead (1998)
Untitled – Split with The Minders (1 Can I Have This?, 2 Lust – 7") – Sprite Recordings (2002)
Sentimental Stations (1 Secret Service, 2 Branding Dennis, 3 I Think You Would, 4 Inside The Blockhouse, 5 Are You Happening?, 6 Doctor No. 8 [Piano Version], 7 Sentimental Stations – CD, EP) – Recordhead (2002)

With Eyesinweasel 
Demos & Outtakes – (1999)
Wrinkled Thoughts – (2000)
Live In The Middle East – (2001)

With Airport 5 
Tower in the Fountain of Sparks – (2001)
Life Starts Here – (2002)

Publications 

 Elliott (2009)
 Tinky Puts His Little Moon To Bed (2013)

References

External links

Musicians from Dayton, Ohio
Living people
American rock guitarists
American male guitarists
Guided by Voices members
1955 births
Matador Records artists
Guitarists from Ohio
People from Leland, Michigan
Musicians
Music of Ohio
20th-century American guitarists
20th-century American male musicians